Real Club Celta de Vigo, commonly known as Celta de Vigo or simply Celta, is a Spanish professional football club based in Vigo, Galicia, that competes in La Liga, the top tier of Spanish football. Nicknamed Os Celestes (The Sky Blues), the club was founded in August 1923 as Club Celta, following the merger of two Vigo-based teams. The club's home stadium is Balaídos, which seats 29,000 spectators.

The club's name is derived from the Celts, a people who once lived in the region. Its main rival is fellow Galician club Deportivo La Coruña, with whom it contests the Galician derby.

Celta have never won the league title nor Copa del Rey, although they have reached the final three times in the latter. The club finished in their best-ever position of fourth in 2002–03, qualifying for the 2003–04 UEFA Champions League, where they were eliminated by Arsenal in the round of 16. In the 2016–17 UEFA Europa League, Celta reached the semi-finals for the first time, losing to Manchester United.

History

Foundation

RC Celta de Vigo was formed as a result of the ambition of Vigo's teams to achieve more at national level, where the Basque sides had been their bête noire in the Spanish Championship. The idea was to merge both Vigo-based teams, Real Vigo Sporting and Real Club Fortuna de Vigo, to create a more powerful team at national level. The standard-bearer of this movement was Manuel de Castro, known as "Handicap", a sports writer for the Faro de Vigo who, from 1915, began to write in his articles about the need for a unitarian movement. The slogan of his movement was "Todo por y para Vigo" ("All for and to Vigo"), which eventually found support among the managers of both clubs. It was backed unanimously when De Castro himself presented the motion at the assembly of the Royal Spanish Football Federation in Madrid on 22 June 1923.

On 12 July 1923, the merger was approved at the annual general meetings of Vigo and Fortuna, held at the Cine Odeón and Hotel Moderno, respectively. At the last general meeting of Fortuna and Vigo, which approved the formation of the new club and was held on 10 August, the members decided on the name and colours of the team. Among the various names proposed were Club Galicia, Real Atlético FC, Real Club Olímpico, Breogán and Real Club Celta. The latter two names were the most liked and in the end they decided on Club Celta, an ethnic race linked to Galicia. The first president of Celta was Manuel Bárcena de Andrés, the Count of Torre Cedeira. This assembly also decided on the squad, which totaled 64 players and included some important players from Fortuna and Vigo, and was managed by Francis Cuggy. Their first match was a friendly against Portuguese side Boavista, which Celta won 8–2.

In 1947–48, Celta ranked fourth, the club's joint highest ever finish, and reached the Copa del Generalísimo Final, where they lost 4–1 to Sevilla FC. Local striker Pahiño, who took the Pichichi Trophy for 21 goals in 22 games that season, subsequently moved to Real Madrid.

EuroCelta and subsequent decline

In the late 1990s and early 2000s, Celta were dubbed "EuroCelta" by the Spanish press as a result of their European exploits . This included a 4–1 aggregate win against Liverpool in a run to the quarter-finals of the 1998–99 UEFA Cup. In the next season's edition they again reached the last eight, with a 4–0 second leg win over Juventus and a 7–0 home win against Benfica (8–1 aggregate). Domestically, the team reached the 2001 Copa del Rey Final, losing 3–1 to Real Zaragoza in Seville.

Key players during the period included Alexander Mostovoi, Valery Karpin and Haim Revivo, though the squad also relied upon other international players as well, such as goalkeeper Pablo Cavallero; defender and future coach Eduardo Berizzo, midfielders Claude Makélélé and Mazinho; winger Gustavo López; and strikers Catanha and Lyuboslav Penev, amongst others.

In 2002–03, under manager Miguel Ángel Lotina, Celta ranked fourth, their highest finish since 1948, and qualified for the 2003–04 UEFA Champions League. They reached the round of 16, where they were eliminated by Arsenal 5–2 on aggregate. Domestically that year, the team came 19th and suffered relegation to the Segunda División. Although the squad was heavily dismantled following the demotion, Celta earned an immediate return to the top flight after finishing second in 2004–05.

In 2006–07, Celta finished 18th and were once again relegated to the Segunda División. The team subsequently fought against relegation to the third tier, and the risk of bankruptcy. This trend was bucked in the 2010–11 season, when new striker David Rodríguez, winger Enrique de Lucas and manager Paco Herrera helped them finish sixth. They were eliminated in the first knockout round by Granada after a penalty shoot-out, the game having finished 1–1 in 90 minutes.

Return to La Liga and Europe

On 3 June 2012, Celta returned to La Liga after a five-year absence. In their first season after returning to the top flight, they avoided relegation to the Segunda División on the final day after beating RCD Espanyol 1–0 to ensure a 17th-place finish.

Under "EuroCelta" veteran Eduardo Berizzo in 2015–16, Celta finished sixth for their best result in a decade and earned a spot in the 2016–17 UEFA Europa League. In their return to European competitions, Celta reached the semi-finals of the 2016–17 UEFA Europa League, where they were eliminated by eventual champions Manchester United.

Identity

Crest
Celta's original crest was rather simple, featuring a red shield with two stylised letter Cs (Club Celta) and the royal crown of Spain; in the year of its foundation, the club became one of a number of Spanish football clubs to be granted patronage by Alfonso XIII and thus the right to use the honorific real (Royal) in its name and the crown on its badge. The following year the shield's colour was changed to the traditional sky blue colour. Like many other Galician clubs, such as Compostela and Racing Ferrol, the crest also features the red cross of Saint James which was added in 1928.  During the Spanish Second Republic (1931–1936), the honorific title and crown were removed from the club's name and crest; however, it was to return under the Spanish State.

Kit
Celta's home colours are sky blue and white. Originally, their home strip consisted of a red shirt, black shorts and blue socks. This was later changed at an unknown date to the current colours, representative of the Galician flag.

Celta had the longest-running sponsorship deal in Spanish football, and one of the longest-running in the world, with the French automobile manufacturer Citroën from 1985 to 2016. The company established its plant within walking distance from Balaídos in 1958, and had first sponsored the club's women's basketball team in 1980. In 2016, the sponsor was changed to that of Galician brewery, Estrella Galicia, which had advertised on the back of the shirts since 2011. Their business deal with kit supplier, Umbro, was also one of the longest-running ones, from 1986 to 2010.

Players

First-team squad 
.

Reserve team

Out on loan

Records

Club
As of 18 March 2023
Most league goals: 179, Iago Aspas (2008–2013, 2015–present)
Most La Liga goals: 145, Iago Aspas (2012–2013, 2015–present)
Most goals in a season: 69 (1998–99)
Most league appearances: 462, Manolo (1966–1982)
Biggest win and biggest home win: 10–1 (against Gimnàstic, 23 October 1949)
Biggest away win: 6–1 (against Athletic Bilbao, 24 March 2002)
Biggest defeat and biggest away defeat: 0–10 (against Athletic Bilbao, 11 January 1942)
Most home points in a season: 46 (1997–98)
Most away points in a season: 27 (2015–16)

Individual
As of 18 March 2023. All current players are in bold.

Most appearances

Most goals scored

Internationals playing at Celta
The following past and present Celta players have been capped at full international level while playing for the club.

Management

Ownership 

Real Club Celta de Vigo, S.A.D. is a sociedad anónima deportiva, a public limited sports company, owned by the Spanish-Mexican businessman Carlos Mouriño, who has been the majority shareholder since May 2006 when he acquired Horacio Gómez's 39.84% shareholding in the club. He currently owns 67.9% of the club through the holding company Grupo Corporativo Ges, S.L.

In October 2016, the club was the subject of a potential 100 million euro takeover by the Chinese CITS Group.

Board of directors 
{| class="wikitable"
|-
!Office
!Name
|-
| President
| Carlos Mouriño
|-
| First Vice President
| Ricardo Barros
|-
| Second Vice President
| Pedro Posada
|-
|rowspan=4| Directors
| José Fernando M. Rodilla
|-
| María José Taboas
|-
| Primitivo Ferro
|-
| Carmen Avendaño
|-
| General Director
| Antonio Chaves
|-
| Sporting Director
| Felipe Miñambres
|-
| Financial Director
| María José Herbón
|-
| Security Director
| Julio Vargas
|-
| Business Director
| Carlos Cao
|-
| 'Fundación Celta' Director
| Germán Arteta
|-
| Academy Director
| Carlos Hugo García-Bayón
|-
| Marketing Director
| Maruxa Magdalena Seoane
|-
| Commercial Director
| Carlos Salvador Herrera

List of presidents

Technical staff

Coaches
List of Celta de Vigo head coaches since 1923.

Honours

National titles
Segunda División
Winners: 1935–36, 1981–82, 1991–92
Segunda División B
Winners: 1980–81
Tercera División
Winners: 1930–31

European titles
UEFA Intertoto Cup
Winners: 2000

Regional titles
Galician Championship
Winners (6): 1923–24, 1924–25, 1925–26, 1929–30, 1931–32, 1933–34

Asturian-Galician Championship (Galician Group)
Winners: 1934–35

Galician Cup
Winners: 2006–07, 2007–08

Friendly and unofficial tournaments
Trofeo Cidade de Vigo
Winners (21): 1972, 1973, 1975, 1976, 1980, 1984, 1986, 1988, 1991, 1992, 1993, 1997, 1998, 1999, 2000, 2002, 2005, 2006, 2008, 2009, 2012

Trofeo Memorial Quinocho
Winners (19): 1995, 1996, 1998, 1999, 2000, 2001, 2002, 2003, 2004, 2005, 2007, 2008, 2009, 2011, 2012, 2013, 2014, 2015, 2016

Trofeo Luis Otero
Winners (13): 1965, 1969, 1970, 1971, 1976, 1982, 1984, 1985, 1990, 1997, 2007, 2010, 2014

Trofeo Emma Cuervo
Winners (9): 1954, 1961, 1968, 1975, 1977, 1979, 1981, 1997, 2010

TIM Trophy
Winners: 2016

Teresa Herrera Trophy
Winners: 1999

Trofeo Xacobeo
Winners: 1999

Trofeo Federación Galega
Winners: 2014

Copa Comunidad Gallega
Winners: 2016

Seasons

57 seasons in La Liga
32 seasons in Segunda División
1 season in Segunda División B
1 season in Tercera División

European competitions

Celta score listed first.

References

Further reading

External links

 Official website 
 Celta de Vigo at La Liga 
 Celta de Vigo at UEFA 

 
La Liga clubs
Football clubs in Galicia (Spain)
Organisations based in Spain with royal patronage
Association football clubs established in 1923
1923 establishments in Spain
Segunda División clubs
V